Neil's Heavy Concept Album is a 1984 recording of songs and spoken comedy routines by British actor Nigel Planer, in character as the long-suffering hippie Neil from the BBC comedy series The Young Ones. Production, arrangements and keyboards are by Canterbury scene keyboardist Dave Stewart, who also plays guitar, bass and drums. Other players on the album include ex-members of bands Gong, Spooky Tooth and Level 42.

Concept 
The title is self-referentially ironic, since progressive rock concept albums are supposed to have "heavy concepts" but "Neil's Heavy Concept Album" does not. Also, the front of the album sleeve is a loose parody of The Rolling Stones' Their Satanic Majesties Request album sleeve. The rear parodies the Beatles' Sgt. Pepper's Lonely Hearts Club Band, with Neil wearing different outfits replacing the images of the four Beatles, and the text "A heavy time is guaranteed for all." replacing "A splendid time is guaranteed for all."

The album followed the success of the Neil single "Hole in My Shoe" — a cover version of Traffic's 1967 hit – which reached number 2 in the United Kingdom.

The album starts with a spoken apology ("Hello Vegetables") in which Neil says the album was "a hassle to make and there's much too much technology and commercial stuff on it". Additional spoken tracks include Neil having a conversation with a potato in a sewer, reciting a poem to his rubber plant Wayne ("your roots are in the ground, my roots are in Twickenham"), and experiencing a flashback in the track "Paranoid Remix" which features Beatles-esque backwards noises and voices, and ends with a parody of the last chord from "A Day in the Life". A parody horror movie commercial, which sees vegetarian Neil being turned into a carnivorous monster after accidentally eating a hamburger leads into the original Planer composition "Lentil Nightmare", a dark heavy metal number that commences as a pastiche of the eponymous title track of Black Sabbath's debut album Black Sabbath and which subsequently quotes briefly from King Crimson's "The Court of the Crimson King" and features Planer singing in an uncharacteristic wailing, high falsetto. In the disco/rap number "Bad Karma in the UK", Neil's mother (played by musician Barbara Gaskin) admonishes him to watch his I Ching, chew his food eleven times, and remember his expectorant. "God Save the Queen" is performed as a cabaret number by a bad American standup comic who sounds identical to the American "comedian" Dino, also played by Planer, in The Young Ones episode Bomb.

The album was heavily promoted by MTV, which had embraced The Young Ones and served as the sole outlet for the original LP in the US. A television commercial for the album had Neil in character talking about his "really beautiful" album, displaying a hole in his shoe, and hitting his head on the table he was sitting under.

Track listing 

The European cassette version of the album is very similar but features the track "Cassette Jam" following "Cosmic Jam" where Neil, realising that the comedy of peanut butter coming around on the LP will not work on the cassette version, attempts to redo the track for cassette with an impression of the album being tangled on tape, followed by "Brown Sugar", in which Neil discovers some buskers performing the track by The Rolling Stones, assumes the song is about whole foods and joins in with them. After "The Amoeba Song", it features two additional tracks: "Go Away", where Neil tries to explain the album has finished, and the B-side of "Hole In My Shoe", titled "Hurdy Gurdy Mushroom Man". These tracks did not appear on the Australian release of the cassette. All four cassette bonuses were included on the 2014 CD reissue on Esoteric Recordings.

There is a title inconsistency on the listing of track 19.  The LP lists "Paranoid Remix" but the vinyl cover has "Paranoia Remix".

There was a 12-inch version of "My White Bicycle" released which featured an "Extended Mix" on the A-side and a "Christmas Rip-Off Mix" on the B-side.

Personnel 

As listed and described on sleeve notes:

Horrible Electric Musicians 
 Bryson Graham – heavy metal drummer
 Gavin Harrison – flash studio drummer
 Pip Pyle – drunken cabaret drummer
 Jakko Jakszyk – heavy and psychedelic guitarist
 Dave Stewart – keyboardist, heavy metal bassist, useless drummer and fifties guitarist
 Rick Biddulph – cabaret bass & Rickenbacker 12 string

Beautiful Acoustic Musicians 
 Jimmy Hastings – flute, saxophone and piccolo
 Annie Whitehead – trombone
 Barbara Gaskin – backing vocals
 Ted Hayton – backing vocals on "Hole in My Shoe"
 Rick Biddulph – 12 string guitar

References

External links 

 
 
 
 http://faqs.org/faqs/tv/british-comedy/young-ones/part1/

1984 albums
Nigel Planer albums
Concept albums
The Young Ones (TV series)